John Jeffers (May 3, 1822 – February 22, 1890) was a member of the Wisconsin State Assembly.

Biography
Jeffers was born on May 3, 1822, in Lisburn, Ireland. He married Flora Ann Armstrong. Jeffers died on February 22, 1890, in Delavan, Wisconsin, and was buried in Darien, Wisconsin. He was a Methodist.

Career
Jeffers was a member of the Assembly in 1864 and 1871. He served as an Independent.

References

External links

The Political Graveyard

People from Lisburn
People from Sharon, Wisconsin
Irish emigrants to the United States (before 1923)
Members of the Wisconsin State Assembly
Wisconsin Independents
19th-century Methodists
1822 births
1890 deaths
Burials in Wisconsin
19th-century American politicians
People from Darien, Wisconsin